Diaphus wisneri is a species of lanternfish found in the Pacific Ocean.

Etymology
The fish is named in honor of Robert L. Wisner (1921–2005), Scripps Institution of Oceanography, for his work on the taxonomy and distribution of myctophids.

References

Myctophidae
Taxa named by Basil Nafpaktitis
Taxa named by Don A. Robertson
Taxa named by John Richard Paxton
Fish described in 1995
Fish of the Pacific Ocean